HMS Mickleham was one of 93 ships of the  of inshore minesweepers.

Their names were all chosen from villages ending in -ham. The minesweeper was named after Mickleham in Surrey.

History
Blackman, R.V.B. ed. Jane's Fighting Ships (1953)
Sold by admiralty in 1966.
Purchased by John Stanley Gordon of Gordon Keeble sports car fame.
Renamed 'Katherine of Gower'
Converted to charter yacht and completed in 1970s.
Sold to Saudi Arabian interests in the 1980s.

References

 

Ham-class minesweepers
Royal Navy ship names
1954 ships